Shiyan (SY) is a Chinese experimental satellite program consisting of a variety of test satellites. Given the classified nature of the satellites, Chinese government statements regarding the missions of Shiyan satellites follow the common refrain of agricultural monitoring and space environment observation — the same offered for other classified programs such as the Tongxin Jishu Shiyan, Yaogan, and Shijian programs. Alternatively named Tansuo satellites, Shiyan satellites occupy varying orbits including low Earth, polar sun-synchronous, geosynchronous, and highly-elliptical orbits and are believed to accomplish a diverse set of missions from rendezvous proximity operations (RPO) to earth imaging. Though similarly named, the Shiyan satellite program is not to be confused with the separate Shijian satellite program.

Notable satellites

Shiyan 7 
Shiyan 7 was launched from Taiyuan Satellite Launch Center (TSLC) on 19 July 2013 aboard a Launch March 4C rocket into low Earth, sun-synchronous orbit, accompanied by the Shijian 15 (of unknown mission) and Chuangxin 3. Three weeks after launch, from 6–9 August 2013, Shiyan 7 performed rendezvous operations with its companion payload, Chuangxin-3, supporting speculations of a robotic arm-wielding satellite tasked with rendezvous proximity operations (RPO). Later, Shiyan 7 shifted to rendezvous with Shijian 7 (of unknown mission) with whom it maintained proximity from 19 to 20 August 2013 until it maneuvered into a 5 km lower orbit. Drawing further suspicion, around 19 October 2013, Shiyan 7 maneuvered to a 1 km higher orbit and released a previously untracked object, designated  which many believe to be a subsatellite to RPO experiments. Such operations, which the Chinese government does not comment on, has sparked debate around the nature of Chinese experimental satellites.

Satellites

See also 

 Yaogan (YG)
 Shijian (SJ)
 Tongxin Jishu Shiyan (TJS)

References 

Reconnaissance satellites
Earth observation satellites of China
Spacecraft launched by Long March rockets
Satellite series
Military equipment introduced in the 2000s
Satellites of China